The siege of Bonn took place in 1703 during the War of the Spanish Succession when an Allied force laid siege to and forced the surrender of the French garrison of the city of Bonn. The Allied forces were part of a general field army commanded by John Churchill, 1st Duke of Marlborough. The siege was portrayed in a contemporaneous painting by Alexander van Gaelen.

It was the third siege of the city in thirty years, previous actions having taken place in 1673 and 1689.

Gallery

References

Bibliography
 Holmes, Richard. Marlborough: England's Fragile Genius. Harper Press, 2008.

Bonn 1703
Bonn 1703
1703 in the Holy Roman Empire
Bonn 1703
Bonn 1703
History of Bonn
Bonn 1703
Bonn 1703
Bonn 1703